Budhni Assembly constituency is one of the 230 Vidhan Sabha (Legislative Assembly) constituencies of Madhya Pradesh state in central India. It is a segment of Vidisha (Lok Sabha constituency). Budhni (constituency number 156) is one of the 4 Vidhan Sabha constituencies located in Sehore district.

Members of Vidhan Sabha

Election results

2018

2013

2008

2006 bypoll

2003
 Rajendra Singh (BJP) : 58,052 votes 
 Rajkumar Patel (INC) : 47,616

1957
 Rajkumari Surajkala (INC) : 9,672 votes 
 Mathura Prasad (IND) : 8,967

References

Sehore district
Assembly constituencies of Madhya Pradesh